The 1947 Yale Bulldogs baseball team represented the Yale University in the 1947 NCAA baseball season. The Bulldogs played their home games at Yale Field. The team was coached by Ethan Allen in his 2nd season at Yale.

The Bulldogs advanced to the inaugural College World Series, falling to the California Golden Bears two games to none in the best of three series.

Future president George H. W. Bush was a third baseman on the team.

Roster

Schedule

Awards and honors 
Bill Howe
All-America First team

References

Yale Bulldogs baseball seasons
College World Series seasons
Eastern Intercollegiate Baseball League baseball champion seasons
Yale Baseball
Yale